The Bonnie and Clyde Garage Apartment is located at  Oak Ridge Drive in Joplin, Newton County, Missouri, though it actually fronts on 34th Street.  The apartment was the location where the Barrow Gang hid out after a series of robberies in Missouri and neighboring states.  After twelve days, neighbors reported suspicious behavior, and on April 13, 1933, the Joplin Police Department raided the apartment.  Two of the police officers were killed by the fleeing fugitives.  Undeveloped photographs, left behind by the gang, helped the authorities eventually stop the gang.  Stolen merchandise conclusively tied the gang to a robbery in Joplin during their stay there.  It was built about 1927, and is a two-story building on a poured concrete foundation. It has a gently pitched hipped roof and exposed rafter ends in the American Craftsman style.

The property was added to the National Register of Historic Places (NRHP) on May 15, 2009 and the listing was announced as the featured listing in the National Park Service's weekly list of May 22, 2009.

References

Residential buildings on the National Register of Historic Places in Missouri
Residential buildings completed in 1927
Apartment buildings in Missouri
Bonnie and Clyde
Buildings and structures in Joplin, Missouri
National Register of Historic Places in Newton County, Missouri